Gerald Melzer was the defending champion but lost in the first round to Paolo Lorenzi.

Christian Garín won the title after defeating Pedro Sousa 6–4, 6–4 in the final.

Seeds

Draw

Finals

Top half

Bottom half

References
Main Draw
Qualifying Draw

Lima Challenger - Singles
2018 Singles